1333 Cevenola, provisional designation , is a binary Eunomian asteroid from the asteroid belt, approximately 15 kilometers in diameter. It was discovered on 20 February 1934, by French astronomer Odette Bancilhon at Algiers Observatory, Algeria in Northern Africa. It was named after the French mountain-range Cévennes, via the Occitan feminine adjective/demonym cevenòla (cévenole in French).

Description 

The S-type asteroid is a member of the Eunomia family. More specifically, it is estimated to have a Sq spectral type, which would also agree with its family classification. It orbits the Sun at a distance of 2.3–3.0 AU once every 4 years and 3 months (1,560 days). Its orbit has an eccentricity of 0.13 and an inclination of 15° with respect to the ecliptic. As no precoveries were taken, and no prior identifications were made, the body's observation arc begins with its official discovery observation.

Photometric lightcurve observations gave a well determined rotation period of 4.88 hours with a brightness variation between 0.57 and 1.1 magnitude. The asteroid has a geometric albedo of 0.21, as measured by the Japanese Infrared Satellite, Akari, and by Spitzer's Infrared Spectrograph (IRS). Determinations of the asteroid's diameter resulted in 11 kilometers for Spitzer and WISE/NEOWISE, 15 kilometer for AKARAI and the LCDB's best calculations, and 17 kilometers for the preliminary results of the NEOWISE mission.

In October 2008, the discovery of a satellite in orbit of Cevenola was announced. The moon measures approximately 6 kilometers in diameter.

The asteroid was named after the Cévennes, a mountain range in southern France at the eastern rim of the Massif Central. Naming citation was first mentioned in The Names of the Minor Planets by Paul Herget in 1955.

References

External links 
 Lightcurve plot of 1333 Cevenola, Palmer Divide Observatory, B. D. Warner (2002)
 Asteroids with Satellites, Robert Johnston, johnstonsarchive.net
 Asteroid Lightcurve Database (LCDB), query form (info )
 Dictionary of Minor Planet Names, Google books
 Asteroids and comets rotation curves, CdR – Observatoire de Genève, Raoul Behrend
 Discovery Circumstances: Numbered Minor Planets (1)-(5000) – Minor Planet Center
 
 

001332
Named minor planets
001332
19340220
20081012